Johann Heinrich Jung (12 September 1740, in Grund – 2 April 1817, in Karlsruhe), better known by his assumed name Heinrich Stilling, was a German author.

Life
He was born in the village of Grund (now part of Hilchenbach) in Westphalia. His father, Wilhelm Jung, a schoolmaster and tailor, was the son of Eberhard Jung, charcoal burner, and his mother was Johanna Dorothea née Fischer, the daughter of Moritz Fischer, a poor clergyman and alchemist. Jung became at his father's wish a schoolmaster and tailor.

After various teaching appointments he went in 1768 to study medicine at the University of Strasbourg. There he met Goethe, who introduced him to Herder. In the second volume of his autobiography Dichtung und Wahrheit. Aus meinem Leben, Goethe discusses Jung.

In 1772 Jung settled at Elberfeld as physician and oculist, and soon became celebrated for cataract operations. He performed over 3,000 cataract operations during his lifetime. In 1778 he accepted an appointment as lecturer on agriculture, technology, commerce and veterinary medicine in the newly established College of Cameralism (Hohe Kameral-Schule) at Kaiserslautern, a post which he continued to hold when the school was absorbed into the University of Heidelberg in 1784.

In 1787, he was appointed professor of economic, financial and statistical studies at the University of Marburg. In 1803, he resigned his professorship and returned to Heidelberg, where he remained until 1806, when he was granted a pension by Charles Frederick, Grand Duke of Baden, and moved to Karlsruhe, where he resided until his death in 1817.

He was married three times, and fathered thirteen children.
His granddaughter Elise von Jung-Stilling was painter and founder of private painting school in Riga.

Chiliasm 
He has been described as "an able defender of Christianity against German rationalism [and] an ardent and eminent Universalist." A Professor Tholuck wrote in 1835 that the doctrine of Universalism "came particularly into notice through Jung-Stilling, that eminent man who was a particular instrument in the hand of God for keeping up evangelical truth in the latter part of the former century, and at the same time a strong patron to that doctrine."

Schopenhauer referred to Jung-Stilling in his example of how rational humans, unlike irrational animals, are prone to error. People can use, according to Schopenhauer, abstract ideas to make other people do anything they wish: "In the year 1818 seven thousand Chiliasts moved from Württemberg into the neighborhood of Ararat, because the new kingdom of God, specially announced by Jung-Stilling, was to appear there."

Works
His autobiography Heinrich Stillings Leben, from which he came to be known as Stilling, is the principal source about his life. Jung's acquaintance with Goethe at the University of Strasbourg ripened into friendship, and it was by his influence and assistance that Jung's first work, Heinrich Stillings Jugend. Eine wahrhafte Geschichte, was put to paper and published (without Jung's knowledge) in 1777. Considered an important precursor of the Bildungsroman, the book concealed Jung's actual surname and gave him the invented name "Stilling", which may derive from the characterization of German Pietists as "the still people in the countryside" ("die Stillen auf dem Lande"). His early novels reflect the Pietism of his early surroundings. A complete edition of his numerous works was published in fourteen volumes at Stuttgart in 1835–1838.

There are English translations by Samuel Jackson of the autobiography Leben (1835) and of the Theorie der Geisterkunde (London, 1834, and New York, 1851); and of Theobald, or the Fanatic, a religious romance, by the Rev. Samuel Schaeffer (1846).

The original German Der graue Mann (1795) was translated into Russian as Угроз Световостоков (Ugroz svetovostokov) (1806), which was translated from Russian into English by Daniel H. Shubin, and published as Menace Eastern-Light, The Man in the Grey Suit (2002).

See also
 Nicolaus Zinzendorf

Notes

References
 Ghervas, Stella: Réinventer la tradition. Alexandre Stourdza et l'Europe de la Sainte-Alliance. Paris, Honoré Champion, 2008.

Further reading
Biographies by 
 Friedrich Wilhelm Bodemann, Bielefeld 1868 (ULB Münster)
 J. V. Ewald (1817)
 Peterson (1890).

External links
 http://www.jung-stilling-forschung.de/ (with bibliography, partly in English)
 Menace Eastern Light, The Man in the Grey Suit: A Translation into English of Der Graue Mann, with a biography, by Daniel H. Shubin. 

1740 births
1817 deaths
People from Hilchenbach
German Christians
German Christian universalists
German male non-fiction writers
German medical writers
18th-century agronomists
19th-century agronomists